Junsei Terasawa (September 15, 1950) is a Japanese Buddhist monk, belonging to the Order Nipponzan Myōhōji. He is notable for being the first Nipponzan monk to be active in Eurasia.

Being a respected mentor, surnamed Terasawa-sensei or simply Sensei, he has undertaken many years of monastic peacemaking practices in India, Europe and the former Soviet Union. Presently, he teaches groups of monks from Russia, Ukraine, Kazakhstan, and China. In 2000 he was forbidden to enter Russia in opposition to War in Chechnya.

Biography 

Junsei Terasawa was born on September 15, 1950 into a poor family in the small town of Hakui, Ishikawa on Noto Peninsula, Japan. Junsei was the second son in the family.

In Hakui is an ancient mound, one of the oldest Shinto temples. It is here that the sacred practice of sumo wrestling was first conceived. There is a Christian church there too, a place that Junsei would often visit as a young man.

Under the influence of the presence of local shrines, spiritual pacifist Leo Tolstoy and active nonviolent resistor Mahatma Gandhi, Terasawa, at 17 years went forth into homelesness to go to Tokyo and join a unique peacemaking Nipponzan Myōhōji activity, led by its founder teacher Nichidatsu Fujii.

Under the guidance of Fujii, he organized and conducted many mass peacemaking actions. This included founding the Peace Pagodas in Milton Keynes and London, England. For the sake of Peace in Europe, shortly before the Berlin Wall Fall, he conducted a seven day prayer without food and water on the grave of Karl Marx, burned his finger phalanx and made a Peace March from Warsaw to the wall.

Terasawa participated in the annual sessions of the UN Commission on Human Rights in Geneva as a representative of the International Peace Bureau and is one of the advisors for the Inter Religious Federation for World Peace, headed by Dr Frank Kaufmann.

As one of the leading activists of the nonviolent movement in Europe of the end of the Cold War, Terasawa-sensei suggested Ukrainian religious leaders make a joint application for peace and a non-violent society in Ukraine. On the day of commemoration for those killed on Kyiv Maydan, he initiated yet another peace walk in Kiev and cities of south-eastern Ukraine.

See also 
 Fujii, Nichidatsu
 List of peace activists
 Nam(u) Myōhō Renge Kyō
 Nichiren
 Nipponzan Myōhōji
 Kam'yanka. All Religions Mount
 Pan'kivka. Peace Pagoda Building
 Peace Pagoda
 Peace march

Notes

References

Further materials 
 
 
 
 
  
 
 
 
 

Japanese Buddhist clergy
Nichiren Buddhist monks
1950 births
Living people
Engaged Buddhists